Loon Lake is a  lake in Douglas County in the Oregon Coast Range of the United States,  east-southeast of Reedsport, Oregon, at an elevation of .

The lake is "a classic example of a landslide lake", dammed by a slide of sandstone blocks which fell into the Lake Creek valley about 1,400 years ago. The lake was discovered in 1852 and named for the loons found on its waters.

See also 
 Ash, Oregon
 List of lakes in Oregon

References

External links
 Bureau of Land Management page on Loon Lake Recreation Site

Lakes of Oregon
Lakes of Douglas County, Oregon
Protected areas of Douglas County, Oregon
Bureau of Land Management areas in Oregon
Landslide-dammed lakes